The 2020–21 IUPUI Jaguars men's basketball team represented Indiana University – Purdue University Indianapolis in the 2020–21 NCAA Division I men's basketball season. The Jaguars, led by second-year head coach Byron Rimm II, played their home games at Indiana Farmers Coliseum in Indianapolis, Indiana as members of the Horizon League.

Previous season
The Jaguars finished the 2019–20 season 7–25, 3–15 in Horizon League play to finish in last place. They lost in the first round of the Horizon League tournament to UIC.

Roster

Schedule and results
The Jaguars had planned to play only three non-conference games, two of which were cancelled due to COVID-19 concerns. Their first four conference road games, at Purdue Fort Wayne and Detroit Mercy, were also cancelled.

|-
!colspan=12 style=| Regular season

|-
!colspan=12 style=| Horizon League tournament
|-

|-

Source

References

IUPUI Jaguars men's basketball seasons
IUPUI Jaguars
IUPUI Jaguars men's basketball
IUPUI Jaguars men's basketball